Drewett is a surname. Notable people with the surname include:

Brad Drewett (1958–2013), Australian tennis player and ATP official
Ed Drewett (born 1988), British singer and songwriter
Hannah Drewett, English triathlete
John Drewett (born 1932), English cricketer
Peter Drewett (1947–2013), English archaeologist and academic